The MM-1 "Minimore" is a small-sized version of the M18A1 claymore mine, currently manufactured by Arms-Tech Ltd. of Phoenix, Arizona. The company literature refers to it either as the "MM-1 Directional Command Detonated Mine" or as the "Minimore-1 (MM-1) Miniature Field-Loadable Claymore Mine". The MM-1 occupies only one third of the volume of an M18A1. Being significantly smaller and lighter than the original, more can be carried at one time (three MM-1 in place of one single M18A1).
 

Specifications
 Length: 5 inches (125 mm)
 Width: 1.5 inches (38 mm)
 Height: 3 inches (75 mm)
 Weight: 14.5 ounces (0.4 kg) (not including explosive charge)

External links

References

Anti-personnel mines
Land mines of the United States